Tapin Tops National Park ( or ) is an  national park that is located in the Mid North Coast region of New South Wales, Australia.

Location and features
Access to the park from Wingham is reached via Elands Road, Wherrol Flat Road, Dingo Tops Road and Knodingbul Road, generally unsealed roads accessible via 2WD vehicles. The park is bounded by the Bulga, Knorrit, and Dingo state forests to the north, south, and southwest respectively, and by Killabakh nature reserve to the east.

Within the park are a number of threatened species including the common and little bent-wing bat and greater broad-nosed bat, the spotted-tailed quoll, the koala, the Parma wallaby, the red-legged pademelon, the glossy black cockatoo, the wompoo fruit dove, and the powerful owl.

Scenic lookouts such as Rowley's Peak provide panoramic views via a platform with a 360–degree view, across  and the Tasman Sea to the east, the catchment area of Caparra Creek to the southeast, and the extensive forested hinterland toward  in the west.

Mountain Brush circuit is a 15-minute walk through a rainforest which contain red cedar and coachwood, brush box, soft corkwood and the yellow carabeen.

Camping is permitted in the Dingo Tops campground. Several swimming holes are also located in the area.

Parts of the Rowleys and Nowendoc rivers and the Dingo and Bobin creeks lie within the Tapin Tops National Park.

Etymology
The traditional custodians of the land now containing the Tapin Tops National Park are the Australian Aboriginal Birpai people of the Bundjalung nation. Tapin is the Aboriginal Kattang word meaning dingo, a subspecies of the grey wolf.

See also
 Protected areas of New South Wales

References

National parks of New South Wales
Protected areas established in 1999
1999 establishments in Australia
Mid-Coast Council